The Blackbirds is a Norwegian rock band from Oslo. The band was formed in 1996, but it was not until 2001, when five became four, that they developed their own style. Two guitars, bass guitar and drums was the recipe for The Blackbirds elegant sound. The four had known each other for many years and this can easily be heard when they are playing. The Blackbirds is a very good live band with experience from hundreds of live shows throughout the country.

In 2002, The Blackbirds song "Naked" was used as the main theme music for the TV show Trigger on NRK. On the final show, 10 May 2002, The Blackbirds played the theme song live. But only seven days after this important appearance for the band, Thor Lønning (guitar/vocasl) suffered from pneumothorax. This set him and the band for a whole year.

When the band was back on track again, they played a lot of gigs in Norway before they met Martin Abrahamsen (co-producer/engineer) and Stein Bull Hansen (producer) and recorded the single "Easy" in Fagerborg Studio, [Oslo. "Easy" was played on over 30 local radios in Norway and stayed for 11 weeks on the playlist of Norway's biggest radio channel NRK P1.

Later in 2005, The Blackbirds started recording their album Riddles & affairs in Grand Sport Studio (Øystein Greni in the Norwegian band BigBang's studio). Lars Håvard Haugen from the Norwegian bandHellbillies produced the album and Nikolai Eilertsen from BigBang and The National Bank was the engineer. Kai Andersen at Athletic Sound in Halden did the mixing and Björn Engelmann at Cutting Room Studios in Stockholm, Sweden, did the mastering.

When the album was finished, The Blackbirds signed with Voices Music & Entertainment AS. They also got a new manager, Jon Christian Foss from Boheme Entertainment; they ended the relationship with Foss in 2007.

Albums 
 Riddles & Affairs (2006)

Singles 
 "Naked" (2002)
 "Easy" (2005)
 "Lovesong" (2006)
 "Getting Close to You" (2010)

Compilations 
The Big Indie Comeback Vol 2 (released in the UK 2006)
Norwegian Wood Music For China vol 7 (released in China 2008)

References

Norwegian rock music groups
Norwegian pop music groups
Musical groups established in 1996
1996 establishments in Norway
Musical groups from Oslo